The Twin Towers Correctional Facility, also referred to in the media as Twin Towers Jail, is a complex in Los Angeles, California. The facility is located at 450 Bauchet Street, in Los Angeles, California and is operated by the Los Angeles County Sheriff's Department. The facility consists of two towers, a medical services building, and the Los Angeles County Medical Center Jail Ward.

The 1.5 million square foot (140,000 m2) complex was opened in 1997, though it remained empty for a period prior to opening because of lack of operating funds. During that time, the deputy sheriffs had to prevent people from breaking in. It was authorized and constructed after the Northridge earthquake damaged the historic Hall of Justice in the city. Security at the facility centers on a panoptic design that allows deputies and officers in a central control room to look through secure optical material to see into all areas of the facility.

Concerns

Despite the state-of-the-art security systems built into the jail, inmate Kevin Jerome Pullum walked out of an employee exit on July 6, 2001, two hours after being convicted of attempted murder, and remained at large for eighteen days before he was apprehended within a mile of the jail. Pullum used a newspaper photograph of actor Eddie Murphy to alter an identification badge he used in the escape. The attempt made Pullum the 13th person to successfully escape the facility.

In May 2013, along with the adjacent Men's Central Jail, Twin Towers ranked as one of the ten worst County Jails in the United States, based on reporting in Mother Jones magazine which stated: "Packed at the best of times, Twin Towers and Men's Central are overflowing with inmates transferred there from overcrowded California prisons under the state's court-ordered reorganization scheme. Eyewitnesses, including several Jail chaplains, have reported that attacks by deputies at the twin facilities are often unprovoked or brought on by the slightest infractions. Additional deputies often pile on, sometimes after being alerted to the action on their walkie-talkies."

The report includes an anecdote, for instance, in which a inmate who sustains multiple injuries in such an attack, is allegedly paraded naked down a jail module as a deputy yells "gay boy walking," placed in a cell, and beaten and raped by other inmates as deputies stand by. The jail has also come under fire from human rights advocates as a central focus in the use of psychiatric drugs to control prisoners.

Notable inmates
The Game, rapper
Freddie Gibbs, rapper
Paris Hilton, reality TV personality. Was in jail for a few weeks.
Conrad Murray, Michael Jackson's personal doctor
Ron Jeremy, pornographic actor
Steve-O, Jackass cast member
Johnny "J", rap producer
Robert Durst, real estate heir and killer, extradited to California to face murder charge for killing best friend Susan Berman
 Harvey Weinstein, former film producer extradited from New York to face his sexual assault trials

Cultural references
It has also been used as a filming location for the movies Blast and Mean Guns, both directed by Albert Pyun.

It also features in Michael Connelly's book The Law of Innocence.

References

External links

Los Angeles County Sheriff's page for the Twin Towers Correctional Facility

Prisons in California
Jails in California
Buildings and structures in Downtown Los Angeles
Government buildings in Los Angeles
Los Angeles County Sheriff's Department
1997 establishments in California